A chemotherapy regimen is a regimen for chemotherapy, defining the drugs to be used, their dosage, the frequency and duration of treatments, and other considerations. In modern oncology, many regimens combine several chemotherapy drugs in combination chemotherapy. The majority of drugs used in cancer chemotherapy are cytostatic, many via cytotoxicity.

A fundamental philosophy of medical oncology, including combination chemotherapy, is that different drugs work through different mechanisms, and that the results of using multiple drugs will be synergistic to some extent. Because they have different dose-limiting adverse effects, they can be given together at full doses in chemotherapy regimens.

The first successful combination chemotherapy was MOPP, introduced in 1963 for lymphomas.

The term "induction regimen" refers to a chemotherapy regimen used for the initial treatment of a disease. A "maintenance regimen" refers to the ongoing use of chemotherapy to reduce the chances of a cancer recurring or to prevent an existing cancer from continuing to grow.

Chemotherapy regimens are often identified by acronyms, identifying the agents used in the drug combination. However, the letters used are not consistent across regimens, and in some cases - for example, "BEACOPP" - the same letter combination is used to represent two different treatments.

There is no widely accepted naming convention or standard for the nomenclature of chemotherapy regimens. For example, either generic or brand names may be used for acronyms. This page merely lists commonly used conventions.

List of chemotherapy regimen acronyms

See also
National Comprehensive Cancer Network Treatment Guidelines
Breast cancer chemotherapy

References

External links
Chemotherapy regimens and references
Chemotherapy side effects
Christie Hospital Chemotherapy Patient Information Sheets

Chemotherapy regimens